Brigadier General Woodrow A. Abbott (1919 − December 29, 1994) was a United States Air Force officer who served as director of intelligence, J-2, and inspector general of the U.S. Readiness Command, which was then headquartered at MacDill Air Force Base.

Abbott began his college education at Butler University in Indianapolis, Indiana, and completed his bachelor's degree in industrial management at the University of Maryland.

References

University System of Maryland alumni
United States Air Force generals
1919 births
1994 deaths
People from Lincoln County, Kentucky
People from Pulaski County, Kentucky
United States Army Air Forces personnel of World War II
Butler University alumni